Bisrampur  is a village development committee in Parsa District in the Narayani Zone of southern Nepal. At the time of the 2011 Nepal census it had a population of 7,089 people living in 985 individual households. There were 3,661 males and 3,428 females at the time of census.

References

Populated places in Parsa District